Thorigny is a commune in the Vendée department in the Pays de la Loire region in western France.

Education
The commune has a public elementary school, École publique Jacques Golly de Thorigny, and private school, Ecole Privée Jeanne D'Arc

Collège public Jean RENOIR, a public junior high school in La Roche Sur-Yon, serves the commune.

Nearby private schools include Ecole Privée Saint Joseph in Fougeré and Collège privé RICHELIEU in La Roche Sur-Yon.

There is also a public library in Thorigny.

See also
Communes of the Vendée department

References

External links

 Home page 

Communes of Vendée